Belcher Channel is a waterway in Norwegian Bay in the Canadian territory of Nunavut. It separates Cornwall Island from Devon Island. Table Island and Ekins Island lie within the channel.

See also
 Belcher Channel Formation

References

External links

 Belcher Channel at Atlas of Canada

 Photo, 2006, Kapitan Khlebnikov breaking ice, Belcher Channel, Nunavut, Canada

Channels of Qikiqtaaluk Region